Anthony Wayne Osborne (July 13, 1926 – August 27, 2010) was an American professional wrestler, better known by his ring name, "Tough" Tony Borne.

Professional wrestling career
Osborne was an amateur wrestler in both high school and in the United States Navy. Promoter Al Haft first convinced him to try professional wrestling. His initial trainers were Ali Pasha and Karl Pojello. Pojello convinced Osborne to shorten his ring name to Borne.

In the 1950s, he wrestled mostly in Texas and Pacific Northwest territories, becoming a mainstay in the NWA Pacific Northwest under promoter Don Owen. in 1953, he had a stint in Mexico, where he wrestled the Blue Demon.

Throughout his career he wrestled for the NWA World Heavyweight Championship against Pat O'Connor, Gene Kiniski and Lou Thesz. In the early 1960s in the Omaha territory for promoter Joe Dusek, Osborne had matches with AWA World Heavyweight Champion Verne Gagne.  He influenced up-and-coming wrestlers who spent time in the Pacific Northwest such as Roddy Piper, Rick Martel, Buddy Rose, Rip Oliver, Lonnie Mayne and Billy Jack Haynes.

After his son Matt became a professional wrestler, the duo worked occasionally as a tag team.

Personal life
Osborne was the father of late professional wrestler Matt Osborne. After retiring from professional wrestling, Osborne prospered in real estate. A pacemaker was inserted in his heart in August 2010, but he died at his home on August 27 of that year.

Championships and accomplishments
Cauliflower Alley Club
Other honoree (1997)
NWA All-Star Wrestling
NWA Canadian Tag Team Championship (Vancouver version) (2 times) – with John Tolos
NWA World Tag Team Championship (Vancouver version) (1 time) – with John Tolos
Pacific Northwest Wrestling
NWA Pacific Northwest Heavyweight Championship (9 times)
NWA Pacific Northwest Tag Team Championship (20 times) – with Ed Francis (1), Shag Thomas (2), Pat Patterson (1), Jay York (1), Professor Hiro (1), Mr. Fuji (1), Moondog Mayne (11), Tony Marino (1) and The Skull (1)
Ring Around The Northwest Newsletter
Wrestler of the Year (1966)
Tag Team of the Year (1967–1969) with Lonnie Mayne
Southwest Sports/World Class Championship Wrestling
NWA Brass Knuckles Championship (Texas version) (4 times)
NWA Texas Tag Team Championship (2 times) – with Danny McShain (1) and Don Manoukian (1)
NWA World Tag Team Championship (1 time) - with Ivan the Terrible
Superstar Championship Wrestling
SCW Western States Tag Team Championship (1 time) - with Moondog Mayne

References

External links
 

1926 births
2010 deaths
20th-century professional wrestlers
American male professional wrestlers
American real estate businesspeople
Sportspeople from Columbus, Ohio
Professional wrestlers from Ohio
People from Oak Grove, Oregon
United States Navy personnel of World War II
WCWA Brass Knuckles Champions